May O'Callaghan (1881–1973) was born in Wexford. Known to many as O'C she was a suffragette and communist.

Life
Callaghan was born in Wexford. She studied Modern Languages at the University of Vienna and between 1901 and 1914 taught English and gave lectures on the Irish Literary Revival.

In 1916 she was writing letters on behalf of East London Federation of Suffragettes. This was a socialist suffragette organisation that broke away from Women's Social and Political Union.

Along with Nellie Cohen (sister of Rose Cohen), between 1919 and 1921 she ran the office of the People's Russian Information Bureau (established by Sylvia Pankhurst). She was also working as the sub-editor of the Worker's Dreadnought at this time. In 1919 the Communist Party (British Section of the Third International) was founded in the flat that she shared with Nellie Cohen and Daisy Lansbury.

In 1924 she travelled to Moscow where she stayed until 1928 and worked in the Translation Section of the Comintern Press Department.

References 

1881 births
1973 deaths
20th-century Irish women
20th-century Irish women writers
Irish communists
Irish suffragists
Irish socialist feminists